Svenska Fotbollpokalen 1903 II, part of the 1903 Swedish football season, was the sixth Svenska Fotbollpokalen tournament played, the tournament was a replay for the previous 1903 tournament, Svenska Fotbollpokalen 1903 I. 11 teams participated and ten matches were played, the first 9 August 1903 and the last 20 September 1903. Örgryte IS won the tournament ahead of runners-up IFK Stockholm.

Participating clubs

Tournament results 
1st round

2nd round

3rd round

Semi-final

Final

References 

Print

1903
Ros